William Ayres may refer to:

William Ayres (cricketer) (1906–1978), South African cricketer
William Augustus Ayres (1867–1952), Democratic member of the U.S. House of Representatives from Kansas
William Hanes Ayres (1916–2000), Republican member of the U.S. House of Representatives from Ohio
William Orville Ayres (1817–1887), American physician and ichthyologist
Bill Ayers (born 1944), American professor and former radical